Bad Company is a 1946 drama film directed by Paul Barrelet and written by R. Wakeley. It stars Mabel Constanduros and Diana Dawson.

Plot
A dancer whose career was ruined in an accident has her mobility restored by a surgeon. Her boyfriend gives her a stolen diamond.

Cast
Mabel Constanduros as Ma White
Diana Dawson as Mary Jeans
Gordon Begg as Joe Graham
Kenneth Mosely as Tom Gilmore
Bob Elson as Peter Graham
Granville Squires as Ventriloquist

References

External links
 

1946 films
1946 drama films
British drama films
British black-and-white films
1940s English-language films
1940s British films